The Birmingham to Worcester via Bromsgrove line is a railway line in the West Midlands of England connecting Birmingham to Worcester via Bromsgrove.

It is one of two railway routes between Birmingham and Worcester, the other route runs via Kidderminster. The route via Bromsgrove runs into , while the route via Kidderminster runs into Birmingham Snow Hill.

The line serves the following places:

Birmingham
University of Birmingham
Barnt Green
Bromsgrove
Droitwich Spa
Worcester

Services
Passenger services are provided by West Midlands Trains as part of their Birmingham to  service.

References 

Rail transport in Worcestershire
Rail transport in the West Midlands (county)
Transport in Worcester, England
Railway lines in the West Midlands (region)